Bibirevo is a station of the Serpukhovsko-Timiryazevskaya Line of the Moscow Metro. It was opened in 1992, and until the extension to Altufyevo was the terminus of the line. The station is a pylon-trivault, but the columns are cylindrical rather than the rectangular shape found on other similar stations.

Moscow Metro stations
Railway stations in Russia opened in 1992
Serpukhovsko-Timiryazevskaya Line
Railway stations located underground in Russia